Thomas Mason was an American colonial politician. He was a member of the House of Burgesses in October 1696, like his father Colonel Lemuel Mason. He was also a justice for Lower Norfolk, Virginia.

Biography
Mason was born to Colonel Lemuel Mason and Anne Seawell, daughter of Henry Seawell. Thomas married Elizabeth and together they had four children:
 Lemuel Mason (no issue)
 Ann Mason, who married Captain Thomas Willoughby
 Mary Mason, who married William Ellison
 Margaret Mason

References

House of Burgesses members
17th-century American politicians